John Blackwell Hale (February 27, 1831 – February 1, 1905) was a U.S. Representative from Missouri.

Born in Brooks (now Hancock) County, Virginia (now West Virginia), Hale attended the common schools.
He studied law.
He was admitted to the bar in 1849 and commenced practice in Brunswick, Missouri.
He served as member of the State house of representatives in 1856–1858.
He served as presidential elector on the Democratic ticket of Douglas and Johnson in 1860.
He served as colonel of the Sixty-fifth Regiment, Missouri Militia, and of the Fourth Provisional Regiment, Missouri Militia, in the United States service during the Civil War.
He served as delegate to the Democratic National Convention in 1864 and 1868.
He served as member of the Missouri constitutional convention in 1875.

Hale was elected as a Democrat to the Forty-ninth Congress (March 4, 1885 – March 3, 1887).
He was an unsuccessful candidate for renomination on the Democratic ticket and defeated for reelection as an Independent.
He resumed the practice of law.
He died in Carrollton, Missouri, on February 1, 1905.
He was interred in Oak Hill Cemetery.

References

1831 births
1905 deaths
Union Army colonels
Democratic Party members of the United States House of Representatives from Missouri
19th-century American politicians
People from Hancock County, West Virginia
People from Brunswick, Missouri